Anadolu Hisarı İdman Yurdu SK is sports club of Istanbul, Turkey.

History
Anadolu Hisarı İdman Yurdu SK was founded on 1 April 1913.
 Winner: İstanbul Amatör Küme Group
 Winner: İstanbul championship

Branches
Football
Field Hockey
Rowing

See also
List of Turkish Sports Clubs by Foundation Dates

References
 Anadolu Hisarı İdman Yurdu. Türk Futbol Tarihi vol.1. page(24). (June 1992) Türkiye Futbol Federasyonu Yayınları.

Association football clubs established in 1913
Sport in Istanbul
1913 establishments in the Ottoman Empire